Agelasta catenata is a species of beetle in the family Cerambycidae. It was described by Francis Polkinghorne Pascoe in 1862. It is known from Malaysia, Cambodia, Laos, Borneo and Vietnam. It contains the varietas Agelasta catenata var. infasciata.

References

catenata
Beetles described in 1862
Taxa named by Francis Polkinghorne Pascoe